Verreauxia is the scientific name of two genera of organisms and may refer to:

Verreauxia (bird), a genus of birds in the family Picidae
Verreauxia (plant), a genus of plants in the family Goodeniaceae